In Burmese Buddhism, Maung Min Shin, also called Shin Byu, is one of the 37 nats in the official Burmese pantheon of nats. 

He is a representation of historical Min Shin, brother of Taungmagyi (Shin Nyo), both of whom served under King Duttabaung of Prome. According to belief, the king became fearful of the brothers' strength and forced them to fight each other to death.

References

14